Simthembile Madikizela is a South African politician who has been a member of the Eastern Cape Provincial Legislature since 2023. He is the current provincial secretary of the Economic Freedom Fighters.

Political career
Madikizela was elected as the provincial secretary of the Economic Freedom Fighters at the party's provincial conference in November 2022.

Madikizela was sworn in as a member of the Eastern Cape Provincial Legislature on 28 February 2023.

References

Living people
Year of birth missing (living people)
Xhosa people
Economic Freedom Fighters politicians
Members of the Eastern Cape Provincial Legislature